Natar is a town and administrative district in South Lampung Regency, part of Lampung Province on the island of Sumatra, Indonesia. The town had a population of 16,143 at the 2020 Census.

Natar District
The district covers an area of 269.58 km2 and had a population of 191,833 at the 2020 Census, comprising 98,274 males and 93,559 females. It is situated to the north of Bandar Lampung city, and consists of twenty-six villages (rural desa and urban kelurahan), which share a postal code of 35362; many of these are suburban to Bandar Lampung. The administrative centre of the district is the town of Merak Batin.

References

Lampung
Populated places in Lampung